Montorio is a village in Tuscany, central Italy, administratively a frazione of the comune of Sorano, province of Grosseto, in the tuff area of southern Maremma.

Geography 
Montorio is about 90 km from Grosseto and 10 km from Sorano, and it is situated along the Provincial Road which links Sorano to Castell'Azzara.

History 
It was included — along with Castell'Ottieri, San Giovanni delle Contee and the castle of Sopano — in the small County of Ottieri in the Middle Ages. The county was abolished in 1616.

Main sights 

 Santa Maria (19th century), main church of the village, it was built in the 19th century in the place of the ancient chapel of the castle. It is a typical Gothic Revival architecture.
 Castle of Montorio (12th century), built by the Aldobrandeschi in the Middle Ages, it was then restructured by the Ottieri and then transformed into a fortified farmhouse after the annexation of the county in the Grand Duchy of Tuscany.
 Walls of Montorio, old fortifications which surround the village since the 12th century.

References

Bibliography 
 Aldo Mazzolai, Guida della Maremma. Percorsi tra arte e natura, Florence, Le Lettere, 1997.

See also 
 Castell'Ottieri
 Cerreto, Sorano
 Elmo, Sorano
 Montebuono, Sorano
 Montevitozzo
 San Giovanni delle Contee
 San Quirico, Sorano
 San Valentino, Sorano
 Sovana

Frazioni of Sorano